Tarapacá was a province in Chile, from 1883 to 1928. It was ceded to Chile under the Treaty of Ancón, formerly being part of the Peruvian province of the same name.

History
The province was created in 1883, having been awarded to Chile under the Treaty of Ancón, along with Tacna.

Administrative divisions
The original administrative divisions in 1884 were as follows:

On December 30, 1927, Tarapacá Province was renamed to Iquique Province, creating the following:

After the Treaty of Lima, in 1929, Tacna Province, along with Tacna Department, are dissolved and returned to Peru, with Arica Department going to Tarapacá Province, with a new area of 58.072 km².

En 1974, the Tarapacá Region is created out of the former Tarapacá Province, as well as the Antofagasta Province.

See also
 War of the Pacific
 Treaty of Ancón
 Consequences of the War of the Pacific
 Chilenization of Tacna, Arica and Tarapacá
 Tacna Province (Chile)
 Litoral Department
 Arica Province (Peru)
 Tarapacá Department (Peru)
 Tarapacá Department (Chile)

References

Historical provinces of Chile